Cub River is a stream in Franklin County, Idaho and Cache County, Utah, United States.

According to tradition, Cub River was so named by pioneer Brigham Young for its smaller size relative to the nearby Bear River.

See also
List of rivers of Idaho
List of rivers of Utah

References

Bear River (Great Salt Lake)
Rivers of Cache County, Utah
Rivers of Franklin County, Idaho
Rivers of Idaho
Rivers of Utah